Aliens vs. Predator: Requiem (stylized as  AVPR: Aliens vs. Predator – Requiem) is a 2007 American science fiction action film starring Steven Pasquale, Reiko Aylesworth, John Ortiz, Johnny Lewis and Ariel Gade. The directorial debut of the Brothers Strause, the film was written by Shane Salerno and is a direct sequel to Alien vs. Predator (2004) as well as the second and latest installment in the Alien vs. Predator franchise, continuing the crossover between the Alien and Predator franchises.

Set immediately after the events of the previous film, the film begins with a Predator ship crashing into a forest outside of Gunnison, Colorado, where an Alien-Predator hybrid known as the Predalien escapes and makes its way to the nearby small town. A skilled veteran "cleaner" Predator is dispatched to kill the Predalien, and the townspeople try to escape the ensuing carnage.

Aliens vs. Predator: Requiem premiered on November 4, 2007 in Los Angeles. It was released theatrically on December 25 in the United States. The film was panned by critics for its poor lighting, editing, and lack of originality. It grossed $130.2 million worldwide against a production budget of $40 million. Plans for another sequel were abandoned, with further independent entries in both franchises released in 2010 and 2012 respectively.

Plot
Following the events of the previous film, a Predator ship leaves Earth carrying Alien facehuggers. A chestburster with traits of both species quickly matures into an adult Predalien and starts killing the Predators on board. The hull gets punctured and the ship crashes in a forest outside of Gunnison, Colorado, killing all but one of the Predators. Severely injured, the Predator sends a distress signal before being killed by the Predalien.

The Predalien and several facehuggers escape, implanting embryos into several humans. On the Predator homeworld, a skilled veteran Predator, Wolf, receives the signal and decides to kill all the Xenomorphs on Earth. He arrives at the crashed ship, uses an acid-like liquid to dissolve evidence of Aliens' presence, and triggers an implosion to destroy the vessel.

Meanwhile, ex-convict Dallas Howard returns to Gunnison after serving time in prison. He reunites with his younger brother Ricky, who is in love with his classmate Jesse but is constantly harassed by her boyfriend Dale and his two friends. Kelly O'Brien also returns to Gunnison after serving in the US Army, and reunites with her husband Tim and daughter Molly. Another woman, Darcy Benson, begins searching for her missing husband and son, unaware that they were killed by the Xenomorphs. Meanwhile, local waitress Carrie Adams discovers she is pregnant.

Wolf starts killing Xenomorphs in the sewer, but four manage to escape. He pursues some to the power plant, where collateral damage from the fight causes a citywide power outage. Ricky and Jesse meet at the high school swimming pool but are interrupted by Dale and his cohorts just as the power goes out. A Xenomorph then appears and kills Dale's friends. Another Xenomorph invades the O'Brien's home, killing Tim while Kelly escapes with Molly. Xenomorphs also attack the diner where Carrie works, and she is impregnated by the Predalien. Darcy discovers her body in horror. Sheriff Morales then arrives and brings her with him.

Kelly, Molly, Ricky, Jesse, Dale, Dallas, and Sheriff Morales gather at a sporting goods store to collect weapons. Troops from the Colorado Army National Guard arrive but are quickly slaughtered by Xenomorphs. Wolf captures Dallas inside the store to use as bait to lure Xenomorphs, but Dallas escapes. Several Xenomorphs arrive, but Wolf defeats them. Dale is killed during the battle and one of Wolf's shoulder plasma casters is damaged.

As the survivors attempt to escape Gunnison, they learn Colonel Stevens is staging an air evacuation at the center of town. Dallas and Kelly, however, are skeptical since going there would cause them to become surrounded by Xenomorphs. They, along with Ricky, Jesse, Molly, and a few others go for the helicopter at the hospital to get out of town, while Sheriff Morales and Darcy head to the evacuation zone. However, the hospital has been invaded by Xenomorphs and the Predalien, who has impregnated some pregnant women to breed more Xenomorphs. Wolf arrives at the hospital and dispatches more Xenomorphs. During the battle, he accidentally kills Jesse. Distraught, Ricky rushes Wolf with rifle fire only to be injured by the Predalien. The Predator is attacked by a Xenomorph and both tumble down an elevator shaft. Dallas takes possession of Wolf's plasma blaster.

Dallas, Ricky, Kelly, and Molly reach the roof and fight off several Xenomorphs before escaping in the helicopter. Wolf, having survived the fall, battles the Predalien on the roof in hand-to-hand combat. The two mortally wound each other just as an F-22 Raptor arrives. Rather than a rescue mission, an F-22 executes a tactical nuclear strike that levels the entire city to ensure the aliens' deaths, instantly killing Sheriff Morales, Darcy and everyone else gathered at ground zero. The shock wave causes the fleeing helicopter to crash in a clearing, where the survivors are rescued by the military. Wolf's plasma blaster is confiscated, and Colonel Stevens presents it to Ms. Yutani.

Cast

 Steven Pasquale as Dallas Howard, a recently released convict, Ricky's brother.
 Reiko Aylesworth as Kelly O'Brien, a soldier returning to her family.
 John Ortiz as Eddie Morales, the sheriff of Gunnison.
 Johnny Lewis as Ricky Howard, student and younger brother of Dallas.
 Sam Trammell as Tim O'Brien, husband to Kelly and father of Molly.
 Ariel Gade as Molly O'Brien, daughter of Kelly and Tim O'Brien.
 Robert Joy as Colonel Stevens, commander of the military forces.
 Kristen Hager as Jesse Salinger, love interest of Ricky, angering her boyfriend, Dale.
 David Paetkau as Dale Collins, Jesse's boyfriend who bullies Ricky.
 Matt Ward as Mark, one of Dale's friends.
 Michal Suchánek as Nick, one of Dale's friends.
 David Hornsby as Drew Roberts, a pizza parlor supervisor.
 Gina Holden as Carrie Adams, a pregnant waitress; Deputy Ray Adams' wife.
 Chris William Martin as Deputy Ray Adams, Carrie's husband.
 Chelah Horsdal as Darcy Benson, a mother searching for her son and husband.
 Liam James as Sam Benson
 Kurt Max Runte as Buddy Benson
 James Chutter as Deputy Joe
 Tim Henry as Dr. Lennon
 Tom McBeath as Karl
 Ty Olsson as Nathan
 Rainbow Sun Francks as Earl
 Juan Riedinger as Scotty
 Dalias Blake as Lieutenant Peter Wood
 Curtis Caravaggio as Special Forces Commander
 Françoise Yip as Ms. Yutani, the CEO of the Yutani Corporation.

 Tom Woodruff Jr. as the Aliens and the Predalien. Having previously portrayed the Aliens in Alien 3, Alien Resurrection, and Alien vs. Predator. Woodruff reprised the role for the film.
 Ian Whyte as The Predator / "Wolf", the main Predator who arrives on Earth to eliminate the Aliens and all traces of their presence. The production team nicknamed the character "Wolf" after Harvey Keitel's character in Pulp Fiction, whose role is also that of a "cleaner." Matthew Charles Santoro provided the voice of Wolf. Whyte portrayed the four Predators in the previous film.
 Bobby "Slim" Jones ("Bull") and Ian Feuer ("Atomic") as the additional Predators.

Production
Inspired by Terminator 2: Judgment Day, brothers Colin and Greg Strause moved to Los Angeles to break into the film business. After an unsuccessful attempt to find employment at Industrial Light & Magic, the brothers worked on The X-Files film and founded their own special effects company, Hydraulx. The company produced special effects for films such as Volcano, The Day After Tomorrow, Poseidon and 300 and the brothers began a career directing commercials and music videos. Colin believes Hydraulx secured a strong relationship with 20th Century Fox, which owns the Alien and Predator franchises.

The brothers unsuccessfully pitched an idea for the first Alien vs. Predator film and Fox almost bought a film titled Wolfenstein suggested by the brothers, "When the script came up for this movie, they thought we'd be perfect for it because it's an ambitious movie for the budget that they had and they knew that having our visual effects background was going to be a huge thing." The brothers were hired to direct the sequel to Alien vs. Predator in late spring 2006 and had limited time to start filming in the fall. The film's original title was Alien vs. Predator: Survival of the Fittest, but was later dropped.

Filming on Aliens vs. Predator: Requiem begun on September 23, 2006, in Vancouver, British Columbia for a 52-day schedule. During filming breaks, the brothers supervised visual effects work on 300, Shooter and Fantastic Four: Rise of the Silver Surfer by using in-house supervisors and a system called Mavis and Lucy, which let the brothers track, view and approve dailies. Colin estimates Hydraulx produced 460 of the 500 visual effects shots including the nuclear explosion which was created using Maya fluids and BA Volume Shader. The interior of the Predator ship was created using CGI, as the brothers felt it would be more cost effective than building a set. The visual effects team peaked at 110 people for several months and averaged 70, almost all of the entire Hydraulx staff.

Using their knowledge in visual effects and making use of principal photography, the brothers tried to film as much as they could on camera without resorting to CGI, Colin said "other than the exterior spaceship shots, there are no pure CG shots." CGI was used for the Alien tails and inner jaws, whereas they required puppeteers and wire removal on previous films. The main visual effects of the film included set design, a nuclear explosion, the Predator's ship crashing and the Predator cloak, about which Colin stated: "We wanted to make sure it didn't look too digital."

As a side-note, in the DVD commentary the brothers explained that they wanted actor Adam Baldwin to reprise his role as Garber in Predator 2, but were unable to do so, instead using Robert Joy as a new character. Additionally, while the previous installment attracted casual moviegoers as well as fans of the franchises, the film catered exclusively to Alien and Predator fans with many references to the previous films appearing in the film.

Music

Composer Brian Tyler was hired to write the score for the film. The soundtrack album was released on December 11, 2007, by Varèse Sarabande. Despite not appearing in the CD soundtrack, the song "Wach auf!" ("Wake Up") by German band Oomph!, was released as a promo in January 2008, with the music video using clips from the film. The song was appeared on the band's album Monster.

Release

Theatrical
Aliens vs. Predator: Requiem had its premiere at the Los Angeles Comic Book and Sci Fi Convention in Los Angeles on November 4, 2007. The Brothers Strause attended the event, presenting the film to an audience for the first time. The film was later released in the United States and in other territories on December 25, 2007.

Home media
Aliens vs. Predator: Requiem was released on DVD, Blu-ray and PSP UMD Disc on April 15, 2008, in North America and May 12, 2008, in the United Kingdom by Fox Home Entertainment. It was released in three versions: a single-disc, R-rated version of the 94-minute theatrical presentation, a single-disc unrated version extended to 101 minutes and a two-disc unrated version with the 101-minute film and a second disc of special features. Extra features on the single-disc editions include two audio commentary tracks: one by the directors and producer John Davis and a second by creature effects designers and creators Tom Woodruff Jr. and Alec Gillis.

Disc one of the two-disc unrated edition includes both commentary tracks as well as both cuts of the film seamlessly branched and an exclusive "Weyland-Yutani archives" picture-in-picture reference guide to the warring alien races; five behind-the-scenes featurettes: Prepare for War: Development & Production, Fight to the Finish, The Nightmare Returns: Creating the Aliens, Crossbreed: The Predalien and Building the Predator Homeworld; multiple galleries of still photos showing the creature designs and sets; and the film's theatrical trailer. The second disc includes a "digital copy" download feature.

In its first week of release, the film debuted at number two on the DVD charts, earning $7.7 million and number one on the Blu-ray charts. The film has made $27,403,705 in DVD sales in the United States.

Reception

Box office
Aliens vs. Predator: Requiem opened in North America in 2,563 theaters along with The Bucket List and The Water Horse: Legend of the Deep. It was rated R for violence, gore and language, unlike its predecessor, which was given a PG-13 rating. In the UK and Australia, the BBFC's classification decision for the film is the same as the original (Rated 15), whilst the Australian ACB rated the film MA15+, up from the original's M rating.

The film grossed $9,515,615 on its opening day for an average of $3,707 per theater and was number six at the box office. It grossed $5 million in Australia, $9 million in Japan and the United Kingdom and $7 million in Russia, and had an international total of $86,288,761. The film had a domestic gross of $41,797,066 and an international gross of $88,493,819, bringing it to a total of $130,290,885.

Critical response
On Rotten Tomatoes, Aliens vs. Predator: Requiem has an approval rating of  based on reviews from  critics. The website's consensus states: "The increased gore and violence over the first Alien vs. Predator can't excuse Requiems disorienting editing, excessively murky lighting, and lack of new ideas." On Metacritic, the film has a score of 29 out of 100, same as its predecessor, based on reviews from 14 critics, indicating "generally unfavorable reviews". Audiences polled by CinemaScore gave the film a grade of "C" on an A+ to F scale.

Chris Hewitt of Empire called it an "early but strong contender for worst movie of 2008". Stina Chyn of Film Threat felt the camerawork "is a smidge too shaky and the lighting/color design too dark for me to relish the Predator-on-Alien butt-kicking". Josh Rosenblatt of The Austin Chronicle dismissed the film stating it was "An orgy of mindless violence, a random collection of bloody bodies, alien misanthropy and slobbering carnage designed to bore straight into the pleasure centers of 13-year-old boys and leave the rest of us wondering when the movies got so damn loud." Kirk Honeycutt of The Hollywood Reporter contributor called it a "dull actioner that looks like a bad video game".

Chris Nashawaty of Entertainment Weekly felt it was a "B movie that truly earns its B," and gave it a grading of "B" on an A to F scale. Variety contributor Joe Leydon said it "Provides enough cheap thrills and modest suspense to shake a few shekels from genre fans before really blasting off as homevid product". Ryan Stewart of Cinematical said he "can't recommend it as a good movie on its own merits, stocked as it is with cardboard cutout characters and a barely coherent plot, but it's miles more interesting than the last Alien vs. Predator film."

Conversely, Neil Genzlinger of The New York Times stated: "It may not be classic sci-fi like the original Alien, which it has in its DNA, but it's a perfectly respectable next step in the series."

Accolades

Other media

Future

During the production of Aliens vs. Predator: Requiem, the Brothers Strause expressed plans for a third Alien vs. Predator installment. However, the planned sequel was put on hold indefinitely.

The Predator franchise continued with Nimród Antal's Predators, Shane Black's The Predator (the latter of which featured references to AVP such as shurikens and Lex's spear which Scar made out of an Alien tail), and Dan Trachtenberg's Prey, while the Alien franchise proceeded with Ridley Scott's Prometheus and Alien: Covenant.

Video game

A tie-in video game for the film was released on November 13, 2007, in North America, November 30 in Europe and December 6 in Australia. The game, developed by Rebellion Developments and published by Sierra Entertainment, was a third-person action-adventure game, allowing players to take the role of the Predator from the film. Much like the movie, the game received generally negative reviews from the press.

See also

 Alien franchise
 Predator franchise
 List of action films of the 2000s
 List of horror films of 2007
 List of science-fiction films of the 2000s

References

External links
 
 
 

2007 films
2007 horror films
2007 action thriller films
2000s science fiction horror films
American sequel films
American science fiction horror films
2000s English-language films
2000s monster movies
Alien vs. Predator (franchise) films
Alien invasions in films
Films about invisibility
Military of the United States in fiction
Horror crossover films
American crossover films
Films scored by Brian Tyler
Films based on Dark Horse Comics
Films set in 2004
Films set in forests
Films set in hospitals
Films set in the United States
Films set in Colorado
Films set on fictional planets
Films shot in Vancouver
Prequel films
Interquel films
20th Century Fox films
Davis Entertainment films
Brandywine Productions films
Dune Entertainment films
Films produced by John Davis
Films produced by Walter Hill
Films about extraterrestrial life
2007 directorial debut films
2000s American films
American prequel films